The  is an electric multiple unit (EMU) commuter train type operated by the private railway operator Kintetsu Railway since 2000.

Operations 
The 5820 series sets mainly operate on Nara Line services, including through-running to and from Hanshin Electric Railway lines. In addition, two of these sets are set aside for operations on the Osaka Line.

Formations 
, the fleet consists of seven six-car sets, with five sets based at Saidaiji Depot for Nara Line services, and two sets based at Takayasu Depot for use on Osaka Line services.

Saidaiji Depot sets 
As of 1 April 2012, there are five six-car sets, based at Saidaiji Depot, formed as follows, with three motored (M) cars and three non-powered trailer (T) cars, and the 5720 car at the Namba/Kyoto end.

The motored cars are each fitted with one cross-arm or single-arm pantograph.

Takayasu Depot sets 
The two six-car Osaka Line sets are formed as follows, with three motored (M) cars and three non-powered trailer (T) cars, and the 5350 car at the Osaka end.

The motored cars are each fitted with one cross-arm or single-arm pantograph.

Interior 
Passenger accommodation consists of longitudinal bench seating on the ends of each car. The sections between the doors can be rotated into either a 2+2 perpendicular configuration or a six-seat longitudinal configuration.

A western-style toilet is installed on the Osaka Line sets.

See also

Kansai
 Kintetsu 6820 series, a narrow-gauge 2-car derivative of the 9020 series
 Kintetsu 9020 series, similar two-car sets
 Kintetsu 9820 series, similar six-car sets with permanent longitudinal seating throughout

Kanto
 Tobu 50090 series and 70090 series, Tobu Railway commuter EMU types that also features rotating longitudinal/transverse seating
 Keio 5000 series, a Keio commuter EMU type that also features rotating longitudinal/transverse seating
 Keikyu 2100 series, a Keikyu commuter EMU type that also features transverse seating
 Keikyu 1000 series, another Keikyu commuter EMU type also features rotating transverse seating (batch 20 only)

References

External links 

 Kintetsu "Series 21" (3220/5820/9020/9820/6820 series) train information 

Electric multiple units of Japan
5820 series
Train-related introductions in 2000

1500 V DC multiple units of Japan
Kinki Sharyo multiple units